Sarata is a river in Ukraine and Moldova, which discharges into the Sasyk Lagoon. The river originates in the territory of Moldova. Length 120 km. Area of watershed 1 250 km2. In summer it dries up. The river has tributaries: Babei, Gealair, Copceac.

Rivers of Odesa Oblast
Rivers of Moldova
International rivers of Europe